The Loop I Bubble is a cavity in the interstellar medium (ISM) of the Orion Arm of the Milky Way. From our Sun's point of view, it is situated towards the Galactic Center of the Milky Way galaxy. Two conspicuous tunnels connect the Local Bubble with the Loop I Bubble cavity (the Lupus Tunnel). The Loop I Bubble is a supershell.

The Loop I Bubble is located roughly 100 parsecs, or 330 light years, from the Sun. The Loop I Bubble was created by supernovae and stellar winds in the Scorpius–Centaurus association, some 500 light years from the Sun. The Loop I Bubble contains the star Antares (also known as Alpha Scorpii). Several tunnels connect the cavities of the Local Bubble with the Loop I Bubble, called the "Lupus Tunnel".

See also
Local Bubble
Orion Arm
Superbubble

References

Interstellar media
Orion–Cygnus Arm